The Pre-Election Presidential Transition Act of 2010 is an Act of Congress passed in 2010 to better ready presidential campaigns for their potential transition before the election occurs. It provides mechanisms for the GSA to work with major party candidates on a potential transition before Election Day to allow for a smoother transition of power. The first example of a presidential campaign using this act is the Mitt Romney 2012 presidential campaign, which had a planned transition, including meetings with the GSA.

Among other things, the federal statute requires the GSA to inform major-party presidential candidates along with what the GSA might consider third-party “principal contenders” in a presidential general election of their right to receive certain services, facilities, and supplies within three business days of nomination by their party. It was passed in part due to national security concerns following the 9/11 attacks.

References 

Acts of the 111th United States Congress
United States federal defense and national security legislation
United States presidential transitions